Ronald Carlton Vivian Pidade Noronha (1916-1982), known as RP to his colleagues, was an Indian civil service officer, writer and the chief secretary of Madhya Pradesh. He was the author of A Tale Told By An Idiot, an autobiography. The Government of India awarded him the Padma Bhushan, the third highest civilian award, in 1975.

Biography

R. C. V. P. Noronha was born on 14 May 1916 at Hyderabad in the south Indian state of Telangana. The only son of an engineer-doctor couple, he did his pre-college at Inter College, Vishakhapatnam and secured a graduate degree with honours from Loyola College, Madras and moved to the London School of Economics which earned a BSc (honours) from the University of London. Subsequently, he joined Indian Civil Service, topping the qualifying examination. He served as the chief secretary for two terms, November 1963 to August 1968 and September 1972 to May 1974 and retired from service.

After retirement, Noronha published his autobiography in 1976 under the title, A Tale Told By An Idiot. He was married to Amy Alvares and the couple had two sons, Ashok and Terence, and two daughters, Gabrielle and Anjali. He died on 23 November 1982, at the age of 66, at Bhopal in Madhya Pradesh,. succumbing to heart attack.

Awards and honors 
The Government of India awarded him the Padma Bhushan, the third highest civilian award, in 1975. RCVP Noronha Academy of Administration, the principal civil service training institute of the Government of Madhya Pradesh, is named after him.

See also

 Anthony de Sa (politician)

References

Further reading

External links
 

Recipients of the Padma Bhushan in civil service
Indian Administrative Service officers
1916 births
1982 deaths
Writers from Hyderabad, India
Loyola College, Chennai alumni
Alumni of the London School of Economics
Alumni of the University of London
Indian Civil Service (British India) officers